Richard Sherman (fl. 1364–1397) was an English ironmonger and property owner in Derby, who served two terms as a bailiff and served two terms as a Member of Parliament from Derby, being chosen first in November 1384 (serving with John de Stockes) and again in 1391 (with Thomas Docking).

References

English MPs November 1384
English MPs 1391
Members of the Parliament of England for Derby
Year of birth unknown
Year of death unknown
Ironmongers
Bailiffs